"In a Moment Like This" is a song performed by Chanée and N'evergreen and composed Thomas G:son, Henrik Sethsson and Erik Bernholm, and was the Danish entry at the Eurovision Song Contest 2010, held in Oslo, Norway on 29 May 2010.

The song was the winner of the Dansk Melodi Grand Prix contest, held on 6 February, which selected the Danish entry for Eurovision. With 149 points, they placed fourth at the Eurovision Song Contest 2010 held in Oslo.

The song didn't escape controversy as it was alleged that it was too similar to The Police "Every Breath You Take".

Later in 2010, the song was covered by South African artists Lianie May & Jay. Swedish band Scotts recorded a cover version of the song as a duet with Erica Sjöström from the Drifters, which in 2010 appeared on both on the Scotts album Vi gör det igen and the Drifters' album Stanna hos mig.

Charts

References

External links
Official music video

Eurovision songs of 2010
Eurovision songs of Denmark
2010 singles
Male–female vocal duets
Songs written by Thomas G:son
Scotts (band) songs
Drifters (Swedish band) songs
2010 songs
Songs written by Erik Bernholm